Heinrich Reuss is the name of many male members of the German noble House of Reuss. It may refer to:

Henry II, Count of Reuss-Gera (1572–1635)
Henry X, Count of Reuss-Lobenstein (1621–1671), first Count of Reuss-Lobenstein, youngest son of Henry II, Count of Reuss-Gera
Heinrich X, Count of Reuss-Ebersdorf (1662–1711), Count of Reuss-Lobenstein and first Count of Reuss-Ebersdorf from 1678 to 1711, youngest son of Henry X, Count of Reuss-Lobenstein
Heinrich XXIV, Count Reuss of Köstritz (1681–1748), first Count Reuss of Köstritz from 1692 to 1748
Heinrich XXIX, Count of Reuss-Ebersdorf (1699–1747), Count of Reuss-Ebersdorf from 1711 to 1747, son of Heinrich X, Count of Reuss-Ebersdorf
Heinrich von Reuss (Heinrich VI, 1707–1783), Danish government official, second son of Heinrich XXIV, Count Reuss of Köstritz
Heinrich IX, Count Reuss of Köstritz (1711–1780), German lawyer, Count Reuss of Köstritz, fourth son of Heinrich XXIV, Count Reuss of Köstritz
Heinrich XI, Prince Reuss of Greiz (1722–1800), Count of Reuss-Obergreiz from 1723 to 1778 and first Prince Reuss of Greiz from 1778 to 1800
Heinrich XXIV, Count Reuss of Ebersdorf (1724–1779), Count of Reuss-Ebersdorf from 1711 to 1779, eldest son of Heinrich XXIX, Count of Reuss-Ebersdorf
Heinrich XIII, Prince Reuss of Greiz (1747–1817), Prince Reuss of Greiz from 1800 to 1817, second son of Heinrich XI, Prince Reuss of Greiz
Heinrich XV, Prince Reuss of Greiz (1751–1825), Imperial Austrian field marshal, fourth son of Heinrich XI, Prince Reuss of Greiz
Heinrich XLII, Prince Reuss-Schleiz und Gera (1752–1818), Count of Reuss-Schleiz from 1784 to 1802, first Count of Reuss-Schleiz und Gera from 1802 to 1806, and first Prince of Reuss-Schleiz und Gera from 1806 to 1818
Heinrich LXII, Prince Reuss Younger Line (1785–1854), Prince of Reuss-Schleiz und Gera from 1818 to 1848 and first Prince Reuss Younger Line from 1848 to 1854, son of Heinrich XLII, Prince Reuss-Schleiz und Gera
Heinrich LXIII, Prince Reuss of Köstritz (1786–1841), senior member of the Köstritz branch of the House of Reuss, grandson of Heinrich IX, Count Reuss of Köstritz
Heinrich LXVII, Prince Reuss Younger Line (1789–1867), Prince Reuss Younger Line from 1854 to 1867, son of Heinrich XLII, Prince Reuss-Schleiz und Gera
Heinrich XIX, Prince Reuss of Greiz (1790–1836), Prince Reuss of Greiz from 1817 to 1836, second son of Heinrich XIII, Prince Reuss of Greiz
Heinrich XX, Prince Reuss of Greiz (1794–1859), Prince Reuss of Greiz from 1836 to 1859, third son of Heinrich XIII, Prince Reuss of Greiz
Heinrich LXXII, Prince Reuss of Lobenstein and Ebersdorf (1797–1853), Prince of Reuss-Lobenstein from 1824 to 1848 and Reuss-Ebersdorf from 1822 to 1848, grandson of Heinrich XXIV, Count Reuss of Ebersdorf
Heinrich VII, Prince Reuss of Köstritz (1825–1906), German diplomat and general, third son of Heinrich LXIII, Prince Reuss of Köstritz
Heinrich XIV, Prince Reuss Younger Line (1832–1913), Prince Reuss Younger Line from 1867 to 1913, fourth son of Heinrich LXVII, Prince Reuss Younger Line
Heinrich XXII, Prince Reuss of Greiz (1846–1902), Prince Reuss of Greiz from 1859 to 1902, eldest son of Heinrich XX, Prince Reuss of Greiz
Heinrich XXIV, Prince Reuss of Köstritz (1855–1910), German composer
Heinrich XXVII, Prince Reuss Younger Line (1858–1928), last reigning Prince Reuss Younger Line from 1913 to 1918, eldest son of Heinrich XIV, Prince Reuss Younger Line
Heinrich XXIV, Prince Reuss of Greiz (1878–1927), last reigning Prince Reuss of Greiz from 1902 to 1918, son of Heinrich XXII, Prince Reuss of Greiz
Heinrich XXXII, Prince Reuss of Köstritz (1878–1935), onetime heir presumptive to the Dutch throne, second son of Heinrich VII, Prince Reuss of Köstritz
Heinrich XXXIII, Prince Reuss of Köstritz (1879–1942), German doctor and diplomat, third son of Heinrich VII, Prince Reuss of Köstritz
Heinrich XLV, Prince Reuss Younger Line, (1895–c. 1945), last male member of the Reuss-Schleiz branch of the Younger Line of the House of Reuss, third son of Heinrich XXVII, Prince Reuss Younger Line
Heinrich IV, Prince Reuss of Köstritz (1919–2012), Austrian head of the Reuss-Gera line
Heinrich Ruzzo Prinz Reuss von Plauen (1950–1999), Swiss landscape architect
Heinrich XIII Prinz Reuss (born 1951), German businessman, monarchist and an alleged leader of the 2022 German coup d'état plot